Geun, also spelled Gun, Keun, or Kun, is a rare Korean family name, a single-syllable Korean given name, and an element in some two-syllable names.

Family name
As a family name, Geun is written with one hanja, meaning "axe" (도끼 근), also the name of the unit of weight sometimes called "catty" in English. It has one bon-gwan: Cheongju, Chungcheongbuk-do, in what is today South Korea. The  fffhf 
2000 South Korean census estimated that there were 242 people with this family name.

Given name

Hanja
As a given name or name element, the meaning of "geun" differs based on the hanja used to write it. There are 18 hanja with this reading on the South Korean government's official list of hanja which may be registered for use in given names; they are:

 (가까울 근): nearby
 (부지런할 근): diligent
 (뿌리 근): roots
 (도끼 근): axe
 (겨우 근): only
 (매흙질할 근): to plaster with loam
 (맑을 근): clean, pure
 (무궁화 근): Hibiscus syriacus flower
 (아름다운 옥 근): beautiful jade
 (여자의 자 근):
 (힘줄 근): tendon
 (힘 근): strength
 (은근할 근): subtle
 (미나리 근): water parsley
 (제비꽃 근): pansy
 (뵐 근): see
 (주릴 근): starve
 (삼갈 근): abstinence, prudence

People
People with the single-syllable given name Geun include:
Kwon Geun (1352–1409), early Joseon Dynasty Neo-Confucian scholar
Ri Gun, North Korean diplomat

As name element
Korean given names containing the element "geun" include:
Dong-geun
Jae-geun
Soo-geun
Young-geun
Sang-geun

See also
List of Korean family names
List of Korean given names

References

Korean-language surnames
Korean masculine given names